John Brooks (fl. 1755) was an Irish engraver.

Life
Active initially in Dublin, around 1747 he settled in London, managing a business at Battersea for the enamelling of china in colours by a process which he had devised. The articles produced were ornamented with subjects chiefly from Homer and Ovid. After a period of success the business folded on the bankruptcy of its chief proprietor, Stephen Theodore Janssen, Lord Mayor of London for 1754-5.

Brooks stayed in London as an engraver and enameller of china. Some of his pupils of Brooks worked as engravers in mezzotint, among them Michael Ford and James MacArdell.

Works

Brooks' first known work was executed in line-engraving at Dublin in 1730. The earliest engraved portrait of Peg Woffington is that by Brooks, dated June 1740. Between 1741 and 1746 Brooks produced at Dublin  mezzotinto portraits and engravings.

A catalogue of his works of Brooks was for the first time published by John Thomas Gilbert, and additions were made by John Chaloner Smith British Mezzotinto Portraits (1878).

References

Year of birth missing
Year of death missing
18th-century Irish people
18th-century engravers
Irish engravers
18th-century British artists